Piteglio was a comune (municipality) in the Province of Pistoia in the Italian region Tuscany, located about  northwest of Florence and about  northwest of Pistoia. It has been a frazione of San Marcello Piteglio since 2017.

References

 

Cities and towns in Tuscany
San Marcello Piteglio